The 2009–10 Sacramento Kings season was the 65th season of the franchise, and its 61st season in the National Basketball Association (NBA).

Key dates
 June 25 – The 2009 NBA draft took place in New York City.
 July 8 – The free agency period started.

Summary

NBA Draft 2009

Free agency

Draft picks

Roster

Pre-season

Regular season

Standings

Record vs. opponents

Game log

|- style="background:#fcc;"
| 1
| October 28
| @ Oklahoma City
| 
| Kevin Martin (27)
| Jason Thompson (9)
| Kevin Martin (4)
| Ford Center  18,203
| 0-1
|- style="background:#fcc;"
| 2
| October 30
| @ New Orleans
| 
| Tyreke Evans (22)
| Jason Thompson (12)
| Jason Thompson (6)
| New Orleans Arena  17,306
| 0-2
|- style="background:#fcc;"
| 3
| October 31
| @ San Antonio
| 
| Kevin Martin (29)
| Spencer Hawes (10)
| Tyreke Evans (6)
| AT&T Center  16,966
| 0-3

|- style="background:#bfb;"
| 4
| November 2
| Memphis
| 
| Kevin Martin (48)
| Spencer Hawes (11)
| Spencer Hawes (7)
| ARCO Arena  17,317
| 1-3
|- style="background:#fcc;"
| 5
| November 4
| Atlanta
| 
| Kevin Martin (29)
| Jason Thompson (12)
| Jason Thompson (5)
| ARCO Arena  11,751
| 1-4
|- style="background:#bfb;"
| 6
| November 7
| @ Utah
| 
| Tyreke Evans (32)
| Jason Thompson (11)
| Tyreke Evans (7)
| EnergySolutions Arena  18,825
| 2-4
|- style="background:#bfb;"
| 7
| November 8
| Golden State
| 
| Tyreke Evans (23)
| Jason Thompson, Omri Casspi (10)
| Beno Udrih (6)
| ARCO Arena  10,760
| 3-4
|- style="background:#bfb;"
| 8
| November 10
| Oklahoma City
| 
| Jason Thompson (21)
| Jason Thompson (14)
| Tyreke Evans (8)
| ARCO Arena  10,523
| 4-4
|- style="background:#bfb;"
| 9
| November 13
| Houston
| 
| Jason Thompson (27)
| Jason Thompson (11)
| Tyreke Evans, Beno Udrih (4)
| ARCO Arena  11,762
| 5-4
|- style="background:#fcc;"
| 10
| November 17
| Chicago
| 
| Donté Greene (24)
| Jason Thompson (9)
| Beno Udrih, Sergio Rodríguez (5)
| ARCO Arena  12,364
| 5-5
|- style="background:#fcc;"
| 11
| November 20
| @ Dallas
| 
| Tyreke Evans (29)
| Jason Thompson (8)
| Tyreke Evans (10)
| American Airlines Center  19,871
| 5-6
|- style="background:#fcc;"
| 12
| November 21
| @ Houston
| 
| Spencer Hawes (24)
| Spencer Hawes, Andrés Nocioni (9)
| Beno Udrih (8)
| Toyota Center  16,202
| 5-7
|- style="background:#fcc;"
| 13
| November 23
| @ Memphis
| 
| Tyreke Evans (28)
| Jason Thompson (10)
| Sergio Rodríguez (10)
| FedEx Forum  10,109
| 5-8
|- style="background:#bfb;"
| 14
| November 25
| NY Knicks
| 
| Donté Greene (24)
| Tyreke Evans (11)
| Tyreke Evans (7)
| ARCO Arena  11,375
| 6-8
|- style="background:#bfb;"
| 15
| November 27
| New Jersey
| 
| Tyreke Evans, Beno Udrih (21)
| Spencer Hawes (10)
| Beno Udrih (5)
| ARCO Arena  12,725
| 7-8
|- style="background:#bfb;"
| 16
| November 29
| New Orleans
| 
| Sergio Rodríguez (24)
| Jason Thompson (14)
| Sergio Rodríguez (5)
| ARCO Arena  11,548
| 8-8

|- style="background:#bfb;"
| 17
| December 2
| Indiana
| 
| Tyreke Evans (26)
| Spencer Hawes (7)
| Tyreke Evans (6)
| ARCO Arena  10,021
| 9-8
|- style="background:#fcc;"
| 18
| December 5
| @ Phoenix
| 
| Tyreke Evans (21)
| Kenny Thomas (18)
| Tyreke Evans (7)
| US Airways Center  17,747
| 9-9
|- style="background:#fcc;"
| 19
| December 6
| Miami
| 
| Tyreke Evans (30)
| Jason Thompson (8)
| Tyreke Evans, Jason Thompson (4)
| ARCO Arena  13,186
| 9-10
|- style="background:#fcc;"
| 20
| December 8
| @ New Orleans
| 
| Tyreke Evans (25)
| Jason Thompson (9)
| Tyreke Evans (9)
| New Orleans Arena  13,140
| 9-11
|- style="background:#fcc;"
| 21
| December 9
| @ San Antonio
| 
| Omri Casspi (20)
| Jason Thompson (9)
| Beno Udrih (6)
| AT&T Center  17,353
| 9-12
|- style="background:#bfb;"
| 22
| December 12
| Minnesota
| 
| Jason Thompson (23)
| Jason Thompson (12)
| Sergio Rodríguez (9)
| ARCO Arena  11,333
| 10-12
|- style="background:#fcc;"
| 23
| December 15
| @ Portland
| 
| Tyreke Evans (19)
| Jason Thompson (9)
| Beno Udrih (5)
| Rose Garden  20,588
| 10-13
|- style="background:#bfb;"
| 24
| December 16
| Washington
| 
| Tyreke Evans (26)
| Jason Thompson (13)
| Tyreke Evans (6)
| ARCO Arena  16,579
| 11-13
|- style="background:#fcc;"
| 25
| December 18
| @ Minnesota
| 
| Omri Casspi (21)
| Jason Thompson
| Tyreke Evans (8)
| Target Center  13,144
| 11-14
|- style="background:#bfb;"
| 26
| December 19
| @ Milwaukee
| 
| Tyreke Evans (24)
| Jason Thompson (10)
| Jason Thompson (4)
| Bradley Center  13,745
| 12-14
|- style="background:#bfb;"
| 27
| December 21
| @ Chicago
| 
| Tyreke Evans (23)
| Tyreke Evans (8)
| Sergio Rodríguez (7)
| United Center  19,631
| 13-14
|- style="background:#fcc;"
| 28
| December 23
| Cleveland
| 
| Tyreke Evans (28)
| Spencer Hawes (12)
| Tyreke Evans (5)
| ARCO Arena  16,407
| 13-15
|- style="background:#fcc;"
| 29
| December 26
| LA Lakers
| 
| Beno Udrih (23)
| Omri Casspi (10)
| Spencer Hawes (7)
| ARCO Arena  17,345
| 13-16
|- style="background:#bfb;"
| 30
| December 28
| Denver
| 
| Andrés Nocioni (21)
| Jason Thompson (11)
| Beno Udrih (7)
| ARCO Arena  14,548
| 14-16
|- style="background:#fcc;"
| 31
| December 30
| Philadelphia
| 
| Donté Greene, Omri Casspi (21)
| Jason Thompson (11)
| Spencer Hawes, Sergio Rodríguez (5)
| ARCO Arena  13,156
| 14-17

|- style="background:#fcc;"
| 32
| January 1
| @ LA Lakers
| 
| Spencer Hawes (30)
| Spencer Hawes (11)
| Beno Udrih (13)
| Staples Center  18,997
| 14-18
|- style="background:#fcc;"
| 33
| January 2
| Dallas
| 
| Omri Casspi (22)
| Omri Casspi (11)
| Tyreke Evans (6)
| ARCO Arena  14,294
| 14-19
|- style="background:#fcc;"
| 34
| January 5
| Phoenix
| 
| Tyreke Evans (23)
| Tyreke Evans (11)
| Tyreke Evans (7)
| ARCO Arena  13,630
| 14-20
|- style="background:#fcc;"
| 35
| January 8
| @ Golden State
| 
| Tyreke Evans (25)
| Ime Udoka (14)
| Tyreke Evans, Jason Thompson (6)
| Oracle Arena 18,327
| 14-21
|- style="background:#bfb;"
| 36
| January 9
| Denver
| 
| Tyreke Evans (27)
| Jon Brockman (12)
| Tyreke Evans (5)
| ARCO Arena  14,411
| 15-21
|- style="background:#fcc;"
| 37
| January 12
| Orlando
| 
| Tyreke Evans (18)
| Omri Casspi (11)
| Omri Casspi (5)
| ARCO Arena  14,426
| 15-22
|- style="background:#fcc;"
| 38
| January 15
| @ Philadelphia
| 
| Kevin Martin, Jason Thompson (19)
| Jason Thompson (16)
| Jason Thompson (5)
| Wachovia Center  16,767
| 15-23
|- style="background:#fcc;"
| 39
| January 16
| @ Washington
| 
| Kevin Martin (23)
| Spencer Hawes (7)
| Tyreke Evans (7)
| Verizon Center  17,242
| 15-24
|- style="background:#fcc;"
| 40
| January 18
| @ Charlotte
| 
| Tyreke Evans (34)
| Jon Brockman (14)
| Tyreke Evans (7)
| Time Warner Cable Arena  13,678
| 15-25
|- style="background:#fcc;"
| 41
| January 20
| @ Atlanta
| 
| Tyreke Evans (24)
| Omri Casspi (8)
| Beno Udrih (8)
| Philips Arena  14,809
| 15-26
|- style="background:#fcc;"
| 42
| January 22
| @ Orlando
| 
| Tyreke Evans (19)
| Jason Thompson (10)
| Kevin Martin, Sergio Rodríguez (5)
| Amway Arena  17,461
| 15-27
|- style="background:#fcc;"
| 43
| January 23
| @ Miami
| 
| Tyreke Evans (15)
| Jason Thompson, Spencer Hawes (7)
| Kevin Martin, Tyreke Evans (3)
| American Airlines Arena  18,521
| 15-28
|- style="background:#bfb;"
| 44
| January 26
| Golden State
| 
| Beno Udrih (24)
| Spencer Hawes (13)
| Beno Udrih (5)
| ARCO Arena  14,522
| 16-28
|- style="background:#fcc;"
| 45
| January 29
| @ Utah
| 
| Kevin Martin (33)
| Spencer Hawes (9)
| Tyreke Evans (6)
| EnergySolutions Arena  19,480
| 16-29
|- style="background:#fcc;"
| 46
| January 30
| Charlotte
| 
| Kevin Martin (31)
| Jason Thompson (16)
| Tyreke Evans (7)
| ARCO Arena  14,186
| 16-30

|- style="background:#fcc;"
| 47
| February 1
| @ Denver
| 
| Spencer Hawes (23)
| Jon Brockman (11)
| Kenyon MartinSergio Rodríguez (6)
| Pepsi Center15544
| 16-31
|- style="background:#fcc;"
| 48
| February 3
| San Antonio
| 
| Tyreke Evans (32)
| Tyreke Evans (7)
| Tyreke Evans (8)
| ARCO Arena12934
| 16-32
|- style="background:#fcc;"
| 49
| February 5
| Phoenix
| 
| Donté Greene (31)
| Omri Casspi (8)
| Tyreke Evans (4)
| ARCO Arena14922
| 16-33
|- style="background:#fcc;"
| 50
| February 7
| @ Toronto
| 
| Kenyon Martin (24)
| Spencer Hawes (11)
| Tyreke Evans (9)
| Air Canada Centre18007
| 16-34
|- style="background:#bfb;"
| 51
| February 9
| @ NY Knicks
| 
| Tyreke Evans (27)
| Jason Thompson (11)
| Tyreke Evans (7)
| Madison Square Garden19531
| 17-34
|- style="background:#bfb;"
| 52
| February 10
| @ Detroit
| 
| Kenyon Martin (26)
| Spencer Hawes (11)
| Tyreke EvansBeno Udrih (6)
| Palace of Auburn Hills14152
| 18-34
|- style="background:#fcc;"
| 53
| February 16
| Boston
| 
| Omri Casspi (19)
| Tyreke EvansJason Thompson (11)
| Tyreke Evans (7)
| ARCO Arena14439
| 18-35
|- style="background:#fcc;"
| 54
| February 17
| @ Golden State
| 
| Tyreke EvansJason Thompson (17)
| Jason Thompson (15)
| Tyreke Evans (10)
| Oracle Arena17023
| 18-36
|- style="background:#fcc;"
| 55
| February 20
| @ LA Clippers
| 
| Tyreke Evans (21)
| Carl Landry (8)
| Tyreke EvansBeno Udrih (4)
| Staples Center17903
| 18-37
|- style="background:#fcc;"
| 56
| February 21
| @ Phoenix
| 
| Carl Landry (18)
| Jason Thompson (9)
| Tyreke Evans (6)
| U.S. Airways Center17369
| 18-38
|- style="background:#fcc;"
| 57
| February 23
| Detroit
| 
| Tyreke Evans  (28)
| Jason Thompson (8)
| Tyreke Evans (13)
| ARCO Arena11557
| 18-39
|- style="background:#bfb;"
| 58
| February 26
| Utah
| 
| Beno Udrih (25)
| Spencer Hawes (12)
| Tyreke Evans (7)
| ARCO Arena12938
| 19-39
|- style="background:#bfb;"
| 59
| February 28
| LA Clippers
| 
| Tyreke Evans (22)
| Spencer Hawes (9)
| Beno Udrih (6)
| ARCO Arena13071
| 20-39

|- style="background:#fcc;"
| 60
| March 2
| @ Oklahoma City
| 
| Tyreke Evans (27)
| Carl Landry (7)
| Tyreke Evans (5)
| Ford Center17677
| 20-40
|- style="background:#bfb;"
| 61
| March 3
| @ Houston
| 
| Carl Landry (22)
| Spencer HawesCarl Landry (10)
| Tyreke Evans (5)
| Toyota Center15651
| 21-40
|- style="background:#fcc;"
| 62
| March 5
| @ Dallas
| 
| Carl Landry (21)
| Spencer Hawes (9)
| Tyreke EvansBeno Udrih (6)
| American Airlines Center19954
| 21-41
|- style="background:#fcc;"
| 63
| March 7
| Oklahoma City
| 
| Tyreke Evans (24)
| Carl LandryJason Thompson (8)
| Tyreke Evans (7)
| ARCO Arena12081
| 21-42
|- style="background:#fcc;"
| 64
| March 9
| @ Portland
| 
| Tyreke Evans (18)
| Spencer Hawes (9)
| Tyreke Evans (6)
| Rose Garden20587
| 20-43
|- style="background:#bfb;"
| 65
| March 10
| Toronto
| 
| Beno Udrih (24)
| Tyreke Evans (10)
| Tyreke Evans (10)
| ARCO Arena13412
| 22-43
|- style="background:#fcc;"
| 66
| March 12
| Portland
| 
| Carl Landry (18)
| Tyreke Evans (10)
| Beno Udrih (6)
| ARCO Arena12110
| 22-44
|- style="background:#bfb;"
| 67
| March 14
| Minnesota
| 
| Tyreke Evans (29)
| Tyreke Evans (9)
| Tyreke Evans (11)
| ARCO Arena10736
| 23-44
|- style="background:#fcc;"
| 68
| March 16
| LA Lakers
| 
| Tyreke Evans (25)
| Tyreke Evans (11)
| Tyreke Evans (9)
| ARCO Arena17361
| 23-45
|- style="background:ffccccc;"
| 69
| March 19
| Milwaukee
| 
| Beno Udrih (26)
| Ime Udoka (13)
| Beno Udrih (9)
| ARCO Arena12098
| 23-46
|- style="background:#bfb;"
| 70
| March 21
| @ LA Clippers
| 
| Carl Landry (24)
| Spencer Hawes (10)
| Beno Udrih (17)
| Staples Center17233
| 24-46
|- style="background:#fcc;"
| 71
| March 22
| Memphis
| 
| Carl Landry (23)
| Beno Udrih (7)
| Beno Udrih (10)
| ARCO Arena11497
| 24-47
|- style="background:#fcc;"
| 72
| March 24
| @ New Jersey
| 
| Beno Udrih (19)
| Jason Thompson (11)
| Spencer Hawes (6)
| IZOD Center10068
| 24-48
|- style="background:#fcc;"
| 73
| March 26
| @ Boston
| 
| Carl Landry (30)
| Donté Greene (9)
| Beno Udrih (12)
| TD Garden18624
| 24-49
|- style="background:#fcc;"
| 74
| March 28
| @ Cleveland
| 
| Andrés Nocioni (21)
| Jason Thompson (14)
| Beno Udrih (15)
| Quicken Loans Arena20562
| 24-50
|- style="background:#fcc;"
| 75
| March 30
| @ Indiana
| 
| Jason ThompsonBeno Udrih (18)
| Jason Thompson (11)
| Tyreke Evans (10)
| Conseco Fieldhouse13339
| 24-51
|- style="background:#fcc;"
| 76
| March 31
| @ Minnesota
| 
| Carl Landry (22)
| Carl LandryJason ThompsonTyreke Evans (7)
| Tyreke Evans (13)
| Target Center15582
| 24-52

|- style="background:#fcc;"
| 77
| April 3
| Portland
| 
| Beno Udrih (22)
| Carl Landry (9)
| Tyreke EvansBeno Udrih (6)
| ARCO Arena12875
| 24-53
|- style="background:#fcc;"
| 78
| April 6
| San Antonio
| 
| Tyreke Evans (22)
| Tyreke Evans (9)
| Tyreke Evans (6)
| ARCO Arena11732
| 24-54
|- style="background:#bfb;"
| 79
| April 8
| LA Clippers
| 
| Tyreke Evans (28)
| Jason Thompson (15)
| Tyreke Evans (7)
| ARCO Arena11418
| 25-54
|- style="background:#fcc;"
| 80
| April 10
| Dallas
| 
| Carl Landry (30)
| Tyreke Evans (8)
| Tyreke Evans (6)
| ARCO Arena15247
| 25-55
|- style="background:#fcc;"
| 81
| April 12
| Houston
| 
| Tyreke Evans (24)
| Jason Thompson (10)
| Beno Udrih (6)
| ARCO Arena14549
| 25-56
|- style="background:#fcc;"
| 82
| April 13
| @ LA Lakers
| 
| Beno Udrih (21)
| Jason Thompson (16)
| Beno Udrih (11)
| Staples Center18977
| 25-57

Player statistics

Regular season 

|-
| 
| 6 || 0 || 9.3 || .333 || . || style=";"| 1.000 || 2.3 || .3 || .3 || .7 || 1.7
|-
| 
| 52 || 4 || 12.6 || style=";"| .534 || . || .597 || 4.1 || .4 || .3 || .1 || 2.8
|-
| 
| 77 || 31 || 25.1 || .446 || .369 || .672 || 4.5 || 1.2 || .7 || .2 || 10.3
|-
| 
| 8 || 0 || 6.5 || .444 || . || .400 || 2.3 || .0 || .1 || .1 || 1.5
|-
| 
| 72 || style=";"| 72 || 37.2 || .458 || .255 || .748 || 5.3 || style=";"| 5.8 || style=";"| 1.5 || .4 || style=";"| 20.1
|-
| 
| 25 || 4 || 23.0 || .466 || style=";"| .390 || .882 || 2.6 || 1.8 || .4 || .8 || 8.1
|-
| 
| 76 || 50 || 21.4 || .441 || .377 || .643 || 3.1 || .9 || .5 || .7 || 8.5
|-
| 
| 72 || 59 || 26.4 || .468 || .299 || .689 || 6.1 || 2.2 || .4 || style=";"| 1.2 || 10.0
|-
| 
| 28 || 28 || style=";"| 37.6 || .520 || .333 || .741 || 6.5 || .9 || 1.0 || .6 || 18.0
|-
| 
| 22 || 21 || 35.2 || .398 || .355 || .819 || 4.3 || 2.6 || 1.0 || .2 || 19.8
|-
| 
| 5 || 4 || 13.2 || .417 || . || .750 || 2.6 || .4 || .2 || .2 || 2.6
|-
| 
| 37 || 4 || 8.9 || .459 || .000 || .656 || 1.9 || .5 || .3 || .2 || 3.3
|-
| 
| 10 || 2 || 6.7 || .333 || . || .000 || 1.8 || .3 || .1 || .1 || .8
|-
| 
| 75 || 28 || 19.7 || .399 || .386 || .717 || 3.0 || 1.0 || .4 || .3 || 8.5
|-
| 
| 39 || 0 || 13.3 || .463 || .357 || .694 || 1.3 || 3.1 || .7 || .1 || 6.0
|-
| 
| 5 || 0 || 4.6 || .375 || .000 || style=";"| 1.000 || .6 || .4 || .2 || .0 || 2.2
|-
| 
| 26 || 2 || 12.0 || .486 || . || .583 || 3.3 || .6 || .4 || .4 || 1.6
|-
| 
| 75 || 58 || 31.4 || .472 || .100 || .715 || style=";"| 8.5 || 1.7 || .5 || 1.0 || 12.5
|-
| 
| 69 || 2 || 13.7 || .378 || .286 || .737 || 2.8 || .8 || .5 || .1 || 3.6
|-
| 
| style=";"| 79 || 41 || 31.4 || .493 || .377 || .837 || 2.8 || 4.7 || 1.1 || .1 || 12.9
|}

Awards, records and milestones

Awards

Week/Month
 Tyreke Evans was named Western Conference Rookie of the Month for October–November.
 Tyreke Evans was named Western Conference Rookie of the Month for December.

All-Star
 Tyreke Evans and Omri Casspi participated in the NBA Rookie Challenge during All-Star Weekend.

Season
 Tyreke Evans was named the NBA Rookie of the Year.
 Tyreke Evans was named to the NBA All-Rookie First Team.

Records
 The Kings overcame the second largest deficit in NBA history, beating the Chicago Bulls after being down by thirty-five points earlier in the game.

Milestones

Transactions

Trades

Free Agency

References

External links
 2009–10 Sacramento Kings season at ESPN
 2009–10 Sacramento Kings season at Basketball Reference

Sacramento Kings seasons
Sacramento
Sacramento
Sacramento